Ambulyx semiplacida is a species of moth of the family Sphingidae first described by Hiroshi Inoue in 1990.

Distribution 
It is known from Taiwan.

Description 
It is similar to Ambulyx placida, but the forewing upperside subterminal line is more strongly arched and the yellow proximal border is broader.

References

Ambulyx
Moths described in 1990
Moths of Taiwan